Il ras del quartiere is a 1983 Italian comedy film directed by Carlo Vanzina.

Cast
Diego Abatantuono as Domingo
Isabella Ferrari as Veronica Gatti
Lino Troisi as Tarcisio Gatti
Daniel Stephen as Orson
Antonio Allocca as the Brigadier
Gianni Cajafa as the janitor
Gianni Ansaldi as Arturo Beccalossi
Lara Nakszyński as Lola
Mauro Di Francesco as Jena

References

External links

1983 films
Films directed by Carlo Vanzina
1980s Italian-language films
1983 comedy films
Italian comedy films
1980s Italian films